The Sunset Chapel is a private chapel in Acapulco, Guerrero, Mexico designed by BNKR Arquitectura.

Awards and publication 

 CEMEX Building Awards 2011, Nominado, Sunset Chapel, Monterrey, México.
 World Architecture Festival 2011, Nominated, Sunset Chapel. Category “Civic and Community Buildings”, Barcelona, Spain.

Bibliography 
 Esteban Suarez, Stop keep moving - an oxymoronic approach to architecture, ed:Arquine, Language:Spanish/English, ed:Arquine, .
 Alex Arañó, BNKR Capillas, ed Miquel Adría, Mexico 2011, Language:Spanish/English, .
 Massimiliano Fuksas, "Una pietra nel tramonto", L'espresso, 6 ottobre 2011, p. 181.
 
 
 arquine

External links 
 Architect's official site

Acapulco
Buildings and structures in Guerrero